Rip Curl is a designer, manufacturer, and retailer of surfing sportswear (also known as boardwear) and accompanying products, and a major athletic sponsor. Rip Curl has become one of the largest surfing companies in Australia, Europe, South America, North America and South Africa. Globally, Rip Curl is considered a successful member of the "Big Three", of the surf industry alongside Quiksilver and Billabong.

Rip Curl is now present in several areas of board sports, including skateboarding / surfskating, freestyle skiing, snowboarding and wakeboarding. Some events in these other disciplines include the Rip Curl SurfSkate Festival, Rip Curl Wake, Skate and Music Festival, Rip Curl City Slam (skateboarding) and the Rip Curl World Heli Challenge (freestyle skiing and snowboarding).

History

The company was founded in 1969 by Doug Warbrick and Brian Singer in Torquay, Victoria, Australia, and initially produced surfboards. In 1970, they decided to begin production of wetsuits, with an emphasis on transforming diving technology into a wetsuit suitable for surfing. Alan Green (co-founder of Quiksilver) was a Rip Curl employee in 1969 and developed the first Quiksilver boardshorts at the Rip Curl Factory in April 1970.

In 2019 Tim Baker authored, The Rip Curl Story, a book documenting the company's history. The Rip Curl Story celebrates 50 years of surfing and the wanderlust of the Rip Curl founders Doug 'Claw' Warbrick and Brian Singer. It is pegged as both a business primer and an adventure story.

In mid-2012, Singer and Warbrick engaged the services of Bank of America Merrill Lynch to sell the brand, but the plan was abandoned in March 2013. In October 2019, it was announced that Rip Curl plans to merge with outdoor specialist company Kathmandu.

On 16 August 2021, Rip Curl appointed Brooke Farris as the Chief Executive Officer.

The Search

Rip Curl is responsible for a campaign called The Search. Surf films by legendary filmmaker Sonny Miller were created as part of the Search campaign: The Search (1992), The Search II (1993), Beyond the Boundaries: The Search III (1994), Feral Kingdom (1995), Tripping the Planet (1996) and Searching for Tom Curren (1996), which was awarded Video of the Year by Surfer magazine in 1997. In 2015 Rip Curl relaunched The Search.

Awards
Rip Curl is known for manufacturing technical products and innovation in the surf industry. Rip Curl's "FlashBomb Wetsuit" won three consecutive SIMA (Surf Industry Manufacturers Association) awards for "Wetsuit of the Year" in 2011, 2012 and 2013.

The Rip Curl Group took home six wins at the 2017 SBIA Awards in Australia.

Rip Curl's marketing campaign "My Bikini" took home the SIMA Award for "Women's Campaign of the Year" in 2013, 2014, 2015, 2016 and 2019.

Rip Curl received the 2015 SIMA awards for  Women's Marketing Campaign of the Year ("My Bikini"), Wetsuit Brand of the Year (Flash Bomb Zip Free), Accessory Product of the Year (SearchGPS Watch), Women's Swim Brand of the Year and Men's Boardshort of the Year (Mirage MF Driven).

Rip Curl received the 2017 SBIA awards for Men's Brand of the Year, Customer Service Team of the Year (Torquay Head Office), WA Account Manager of the Year (Kerry Whitford), Ladies Swimwear Brand of the Year, Men's Boardshort of the Year (Mirage Connor Surge), Wetsuit of the Year (Flashbomb Chest Zip), Surfing Accessory of the Year (FLight Posse Backpack), Ladies Brand of the Year, QLD Account Manager of the Year (Sean Finlay).

Rip Curl received the 2019 SBIA awards for Product Innovation of the Year (Heatseeker), Wetsuit of the Year (Flashbomb Heatseeker), Mens Boardshort of the Year (Mirage 3 2 1), Ladies Swimwear Brand of the Year, Sales & Customer Service Office of the Year, Rip Curl National Customer Service WA, Account Manager of the Year (Kerry Whitford), Vic/Tas Account Manager of the Year (Daniel Jenkin), Qld Account Manager of the Year (Sean Finlay), Ladies Brand of the Year, Mens Brand of the Year.

Retail stores

Australia/New Zealand: 61
South America (most are licensees): 94
North America: 29
Africa and Middle East: 21
Asia (Indonesia, Thailand, Singapore, Malaysia): 72
Europe: 55

Sponsored WCT World Tour events

Rip Curl Pro Bells Beach – Bells Beach, Jan Juc, Victoria, Australia
Rip Curl Pro Portugal – Supertubos Beach, Peniche, Portugal
Rip Curl Cup Padang Padang – Padang Padang, Uluwatu, Bali, Indonesia

Sponsored athletes

Winners

Tom Curren, won the World Title in 1985, 1986, 1990.
Tyler Wright won the WSL World Title in 2016.
Mick Fanning won the ASP World Title three times, in 2007, 2009 and 2013.
Gabriel Medina won the ASP World Title in 2014. Gabriel Medina won the WSL World Title in 2018.
Bethany Hamilton and Mick Fanning were inducted into the iconic Surfer's Hall of Fame in Huntington Beach in 2017.

See also

List of fitness wear brands

References

External links 

 

Sportswear brands
Retail companies of Australia
Sporting goods manufacturers of Australia
Privately held companies of Australia
Clothing brands of Australia
Swimwear manufacturers
Surfwear brands
Surfing in Australia
Snowboarding companies
Skateboarding companies
Watch brands
1969 establishments in Australia
Clothing companies established in 1969
Retail companies established in 1969
Underwear brands
Clothing brands
Australian fashion
Multinational companies headquartered in Australia
Shoe companies of Australia
Companies based in Victoria (Australia)
Australian subsidiaries of foreign companies